The Banvit TUBAD basketball tournament, also known as the TUBAD tournament, was a basketball competition played every preseason between teams from the EuroLeague in the City of Istanbul, Turkey. The format of the competition is played in a tournament style.

Fenerbahçe Beko basketball is the incumbent winner of the said tournament.

History
The TUBAD basketball tournament was an annual competition played every September that took place in Istanbul, Turkey. The first season was inaugurated in 2014 in the same city.

Performance by club

References

Basketball in Turkey